Vitamin B12, also known as cobalamin, is a water-soluble vitamin involved in metabolism. It is one of eight B vitamins. It is required by animals, which use it as a cofactor in DNA synthesis, and in both fatty acid and amino acid metabolism. It is important in the normal functioning of the nervous system via its role in the synthesis of myelin, and in the circulatory system in the maturation of red blood cells in the bone marrow. Plants do not need cobalamin and carry out the reactions with enzymes that are not dependent on it.  

Vitamin B12 is the most chemically complex of all vitamins, and for humans, the only vitamin that must be sourced from animal-derived foods or from supplements. Only some archaea and bacteria can synthesize vitamin B12. Most people in developed countries get enough B12 from the consumption of meat or foods with animal sources. Foods containing vitamin B12 include meat, clams, liver, fish, poultry, eggs, and dairy products. Many breakfast cereals are fortified with the vitamin. Supplements and medications are available to treat and prevent vitamin B12 deficiency. They are taken by mouth, but for the treatment of deficiency may also be given as an intramuscular injection.

The most common cause of vitamin B12 deficiency in developed countries is impaired absorption due to a loss of gastric intrinsic factor (IF) which must be bound to a food-source of B12 in order for absorption to occur. A second major cause is age-related decline in stomach acid production (achlorhydria), because acid exposure frees protein-bound vitamin. For the same reason, people on long-term antacid therapy, using proton-pump inhibitors, H2 blockers or other antacids are at increased risk. The diets of vegetarians and vegans may not provide sufficient B12 unless a dietary supplement is consumed. A deficiency in vitamin B12 may be characterized by limb neuropathy or a blood disorder called pernicious anemia, a type of megaloblastic anemia, causing a feeling of tiredness and weakness, lightheadedness, headache, breathlessness, loss of appetite, abnormal sensations, changes in mobility, severe joint pain, muscle weakness, memory problems, decreased level of consciousness, brain fog, and many others. If left untreated in infants, deficiency may lead to neurological damage and anemia. Folate levels in the individual may affect the course of pathological changes and symptomatology of vitamin B12 deficiency.

Vitamin B12 was discovered as a result of pernicious anemia, an autoimmune disorder in which the blood has a lower than normal number of red blood cells, due to a deficiency in vitamin B12. The ability to absorb the vitamin declines with age, especially in people over 60 years old.

Definition
Vitamin B12 is a coordination complex of cobalt, which occupies the center of a corrin ligand and is further bound to a benzimidazole ligand and adenosyl group.  It is a deep red solid that dissolves in water to give red solutions.

A number of related species are known and these behave similarly, in particular all function as vitamins. This collection of compounds, of which vitamin B12 is one member, are often referred to as "cobalamins". These chemical compounds have a similar molecular structure, each of which shows vitamin activity in a vitamin-deficient biological system, they are referred to as vitamers. The vitamin activity is as a coenzyme, meaning that its presence is required for some enzyme-catalyzed reactions.
 adenosylcobalamin
 cyanocobalamin, the adenosyl ligand in vitamin B12 is replaced by cyanide.
 hydroxocobalamin, the adenosyl ligand in vitamin B12 is replaced by hydroxide.
 methylcobalamin, the adenosyl ligand in vitamin B12 is replaced by methyl.

Cyanocobalamin is a manufactured form of B12. Bacterial fermentation creates AdoB12 and MeB12, which are converted to cyanocobalamin by addition of potassium cyanide in the presence of sodium nitrite and heat. Once consumed, cyanocobalamin is converted to the biologically active AdoB12 and MeB12. The two bioactive forms of vitamin  are methylcobalamin in cytosol and adenosylcobalamin in mitochondria.

Cyanocobalamin is the most common form used in dietary supplements and food fortification because cyanide stabilizes the molecule against degradation. Methylcobalamin is also offered as a dietary supplement. There is no advantage to the use of adenosylcobalamin or methylcobalamin for treatment of vitamin B12 deficiency.

Hydroxocobalamin can be injected intramuscularly to treat vitamin B12 deficiency. It can also be injected intravenously for the purpose of treating cyanide poisoning, as the hydroxyl group is displaced by cyanide, creating a non-toxic cyanocobalamin that is excreted in urine.

"Pseudovitamin B12" refers to compounds that are corrinoids with a structure similar to the vitamin but without vitamin activity. Pseudovitamin B12 is the majority corrinoid in spirulina, an algal health food sometimes erroneously claimed as having this vitamin activity.

Deficiency

Vitamin B12 deficiency can potentially cause severe and irreversible damage, especially to the brain and nervous system. At levels only slightly lower than normal, a range of symptoms such as feeling tired, weak, feeling like one may faint, dizziness, breathlessness, headaches, mouth ulcers, upset stomach, decreased appetite, difficulty walking (staggering balance problems), muscle weakness, depression, poor memory, poor reflexes, confusion, and pale skin, feeling abnormal sensations, among others, may be experienced, especially in people over age 60. Vitamin B12 deficiency can also cause symptoms of mania and psychosis. Among other problems, weakened immunity, reduced fertility and interruption of blood circulation in women may occur.

The main type of vitamin B12 deficiency anemia is pernicious anemia. It is characterized by a triad of symptoms:
 Anemia with bone marrow promegaloblastosis (megaloblastic anemia). This is due to the inhibition of DNA synthesis (specifically purines and thymidine).
 Gastrointestinal symptoms: alteration in bowel motility, such as mild diarrhea or constipation, and loss of bladder or bowel control. These are thought to be due to defective DNA synthesis inhibiting replication in tissue sites with a high turnover of cells. This may also be due to the autoimmune attack on the parietal cells of the stomach in pernicious anemia. There is an association with gastric antral vascular ectasia (which can be referred to as watermelon stomach), and pernicious anemia.
 Neurological symptoms: sensory or motor deficiencies (absent reflexes, diminished vibration or soft touch sensation) and subacute combined degeneration of the spinal cord. Deficiency symptoms in children include developmental delay, regression, irritability, involuntary movements and hypotonia.

Vitamin B12 deficiency is most commonly caused by malabsorption, but can also result from low intake, immune gastritis, low presence of binding proteins, or use of certain medications. Vegans—people who choose to not consume any animal-sourced foods—are at risk because plant-sourced foods do not contain the vitamin in sufficient amounts to prevent vitamin deficiency. Vegetarians—people who consume animal byproducts such as dairy products and eggs, but not the flesh of any animal—are also at risk. Vitamin B12 deficiency has been observed in between 40% and 80% of the vegetarian population who do not also take a vitamin B12 supplement or consume vitamin-fortified food. In Hong Kong and India, vitamin B12 deficiency has been found in roughly 80% of the vegan population. As with vegetarians, vegans can avoid this by consuming a dietary supplement or eating B12 fortified food such as cereal, plant-based milks, and nutritional yeast as a regular part of their diet. The elderly are at increased risk because they tend to produce less stomach acid as they age, a condition known as achlorhydria, thereby increasing their probability of B12 deficiency due to reduced absorption.

Pregnancy, lactation and early childhood
The U.S. Recommended Dietary Allowance (RDA) for pregnancy is 2.6 µg/day, for lactation 2.8 µg/day. Determination of these values was based on the RDA of 2.4 µg/day for non-pregnant women plus what will be transferred to the fetus during pregnancy and what will be delivered in breast milk. However, looking at the same scientific evidence, the European Food Safety Authority (EFSA) sets adequate intake (AI) at 4.5μg/day for pregnancy and 5.0 μg/day for lactation. Low maternal vitamin B12, defined as serum concentration less than 148 pmol/L, increases the risk of miscarriage, preterm birth and newborn low birth weight. During pregnancy the placenta concentrates B12, so that newborn infants have a higher serum concentration than their mothers. As it is recently absorbed vitamin content that more effectively reaches the placenta, the vitamin consumed by the mother-to-be is more important than that contained in her liver tissue. Women who consume little animal-sourced food, or who are vegetarian or vegan, are at higher risk of becoming vitamin depleted during pregnancy than those who consume more animal products. This depletion can lead to anemia, and also an increased risk that their breastfed infants become vitamin deficient.

Low vitamin concentrations in human milk occur in families with low socioeconomic status or low consumption of animal products. Only a few countries, primarily in Africa, have mandatory food fortification programs for either wheat flour or maize flour; India has a voluntary fortification program. What the nursing mother consumes is more important than her liver tissue content, as it is recently absorbed vitamin that more effectively reaches breast milk. Breast milk B12 decreases over months of nursing in both well-nourished and vitamin-deficient mothers. Exclusive or near-exclusive breastfeeding beyond six months is a strong indicator of low serum vitamin status in nursing infants. This is especially true when the vitamin status was poor during the pregnancy and if the early-introduced foods fed to the still breastfeeding infant are vegan. Risk of deficiency persists if the post-weaning diet is low in animal products. Signs of low vitamin levels in infants and young children can include anemia, poor physical growth and neurodevelopmental delays. Children diagnosed with low serum B12 can be treated with intramuscular injections, then transitioned to an oral dietary supplement.

Gastric bypass surgery 
Various methods of gastric bypass or gastric restriction surgery are used to treat morbid obesity. Roux-en-Y gastric bypass surgery (RYGB) but not sleeve gastric bypass surgery or gastric banding, increases the risk of vitamin B12 deficiency and requires preventive post-operative treatment with either injected or high-dose oral supplementation. For post-operative oral supplementation, 1000 μg/day may be needed to prevent vitamin deficiency.

Diagnosis
According to one review: "At present, no 'gold standard' test exists for the diagnosis of vitamin B12 deficiency and as a consequence the diagnosis requires consideration of both the clinical state of the patient and the results of investigations." The vitamin deficiency is typically suspected when a routine complete blood count shows anemia with an elevated mean corpuscular volume (MCV). In addition, on the peripheral blood smear, macrocytes and hypersegmented polymorphonuclear leukocytes may be seen. Diagnosis is supported based on vitamin B12 blood levels below 150–180 pmol/L (200–250 pg/mL) in adults. However, serum values can be maintained while tissue B12 stores are becoming depleted. Therefore, serum B12 values above the cut-off point of deficiency do not necessarily confirm adequate B12 status. For this reason, elevated serum homocysteine over 15 micromol/L and methylmalonic acid (MMA) over 0.271 micromol/L are considered better indicators of B12 deficiency, rather than relying only on the concentration of B12 in blood. However, elevated MMA is not conclusive, as it is seen in people with B12 deficiency, but also in elderly people who have renal insufficiency, and elevated homocysteine is not conclusive, as it is also seen in people with folate deficiency. In addition, elevated methylmalonic acid levels may also be related to metabolic disorders such as methylmalonic acidemia. If nervous system damage is present and blood testing is inconclusive, a lumbar puncture may be carried out to measure cerebrospinal fluid B12 levels.

Medical uses

Repletion of deficiency
Severe vitamin B12 deficiency is corrected with frequent intramuscular injections of large doses of the vitamin, followed by maintenance doses of injections or oral dosing at longer intervals. In the UK, standard initial therapy consists of intramuscular injections of 1000 μg of hydroxocobalamin three times a week for two weeks or until neurological symptoms improve, followed by 1000 μg every two or three months. Injection side effects include skin rash, itching, chills, fever, hot flushes, nausea and dizziness.

Cyanide poisoning
For cyanide poisoning, a large amount of hydroxocobalamin may be given intravenously and sometimes in combination with sodium thiosulfate. The mechanism of action is straightforward: the hydroxycobalamin hydroxide ligand is displaced by the toxic cyanide ion, and the resulting non-toxic cyanocobalamin is excreted in urine.

Dietary recommendations
Most people in the United States and the United Kingdom consume sufficient vitamin B12. However, proportions of people with low or marginal levels of vitamin B12 reach up to 40% in the Western world. Grain-based foods can be fortified by having the vitamin added to them. Vitamin B12 supplements are available as single or multivitamin tablets. Pharmaceutical preparations of vitamin B12 may be given by intramuscular injection. Since there are few non-animal sources of the vitamin, vegans are advised to consume a dietary supplement or fortified foods for B12 intake, or risk serious health consequences. Children in some regions of developing countries are at particular risk due to increased requirements during growth coupled with diets low in animal-sourced foods.

The US National Academy of Medicine updated estimated average requirements (EARs) and recommended dietary allowances (RDAs) for vitamin B in 1998. The EAR for vitamin B for women and men ages 14 and up is 2.0μg/day; the RDA is 2.4μg/day. RDA is higher than EAR so as to identify amounts that will cover people with higher than average requirements. RDA for pregnancy equals 2.6μg/day. RDA for lactation equals 2.8 μg/day. For infants up to 12 months the adequate intake (AI) is 0.4–0.5μg/day. (AIs are established when there is insufficient information to determine EARs and RDAs.) For children ages 1–13 years the RDA increases with age from 0.9 to 1.8μg/day. Because 10 to 30 percent of older people may be unable to effectively absorb vitamin B naturally occurring in foods, it is advisable for those older than 50 years to meet their RDA mainly by consuming foods fortified with vitamin B or a supplement containing vitamin B. As for safety, tolerable upper intake levels (known as ULs) are set for vitamins and minerals when evidence is sufficient. In the case of vitamin B there is no UL, as there is no human data for adverse effects from high doses. Collectively the EARs, RDAs, AIs and ULs are referred to as dietary reference intakes (DRIs).

The European Food Safety Authority (EFSA) refers to the collective set of information as "dietary reference values", with population reference intake (PRI) instead of RDA, and average requirement instead of EAR. AI and UL are defined by EFSA the same as in the United States. For women and men over age 18 the adequate intake (AI) is set at 4.0μg/day. AI for pregnancy is 4.5 μg/day, for lactation 5.0μg/day. For children aged 1–17 years the AIs increase with age from 1.5 to 3.5μg/day. These AIs are higher than the U.S. RDAs. The EFSA also reviewed the safety question and reached the same conclusion as in the United States—that there was not sufficient evidence to set a UL for vitamin B.

The Japan National Institute of Health and Nutrition set the RDA for people ages 12 and older at 2.4μg/day. The World Health Organization also uses 2.4μg/day as the adult recommended nutrient intake for this vitamin.

For U.S. food and dietary supplement labeling purposes the amount in a serving is expressed as a "percent of daily value" (%DV). For vitamin B labeling purposes 100% of the daily value was 6.0μg, but on May 27, 2016, it was revised downward to 2.4μg. Compliance with the updated labeling regulations was required by 1 January 2020 for manufacturers with US$10 million or more in annual food sales, and by 1 January 2021 for manufacturers with lower volume food sales. A table of the old and new adult daily values is provided at Reference Daily Intake.

Sources

Bacteria and archaea
Vitamin B12 is produced in nature by certain bacteria, and archaea. It is synthesized by some bacteria in the gut microbiota in humans and other animals, but it has long been thought that humans cannot absorb this as it is made in the colon, downstream from the small intestine, where the absorption of most nutrients occurs. Ruminants, such as cows and sheep, are foregut fermenters, meaning that plant food undergoes microbial fermentation in the rumen before entering the true stomach (abomasum), and thus they are absorbing vitamin B12 produced by bacteria. Other mammalian species (examples: rabbits, pikas, beaver, guinea pigs) consume high-fibre plants which pass through the intestinal system and undergo bacterial fermentation in the cecum and large intestine. The first-passage of feces produced by this hindgut fermentation, called "cecotropes", are re-ingested, a practice referred to as cecotrophy or coprophagy. Re-ingestion allows for absorption of nutrients made available by bacterial digestion, and also of vitamins and other nutrients synthesized by the gut bacteria, including vitamin B12. Non-ruminant, non-hindgut herbivores may have an enlarged forestomach and/or small intestine to provide a place for bacterial fermentation and B-vitamin production, including B12. For gut bacteria to produce vitamin B12 the animal must consume sufficient amounts of cobalt. Soil that is deficient in cobalt may result in B12 deficiency, and B12 injections or cobalt supplementation may be required for livestock.

Animal-derived foods 
Animals store vitamin B12 from their diets in their livers and muscles and some pass the vitamin into their eggs and milk. Meat, liver, eggs and milk are therefore sources of the vitamin for other animals, including humans. For humans, the bioavailability from eggs is less than 9%, compared to 40% to 60% from fish, fowl and meat. Insects are a source of B12 for animals (including other insects and humans). Animal-derived food sources with a high concentration of vitamin B12 include liver and other organ meats from lamb, veal, beef, and turkey; also shellfish and crab meat.

Plants and algae
Natural plant and algae sources of vitamin B12 include fermented plant foods such as tempeh and seaweed-derived foods such as nori and laver. Other types of algae are rich in B12, with some species, such as Porphyra yezoensis, containing as much cobalamin as liver. Methylcobalamin has been identified in Chlorella vulgaris. Since only bacteria and some archea possess the genes and enzymes necessary to synthesize vitamin B12, plant and algae sources all obtain the vitamin secondarily from symbiosis with various species of bacteria, or in the case of fermented plant foods, from bacterial fermentation.

The Academy of Nutrition and Dietetics considers plant and algae sources "unreliable", stating that vegans should turn to fortified foods and supplements instead.

Fortified foods
Foods for which vitamin B12-fortified versions are available include breakfast cereals, plant-derived milk substitutes such as soy milk and oat milk, energy bars, and nutritional yeast. The fortification ingredient is cyanocobalamin. Microbial fermentation yields adenosylcobalamin, which is then converted to cyanocobalamin by addition of potassium cyanide or thiocyanate in the presence of sodium nitrite and heat.

As of 2019, nineteen countries require food fortification of wheat flour, maize flour or rice with vitamin B12. Most of these are in southeast Africa or Central America.

Vegan advocacy organizations, among others, recommend that every vegan consume B12 from either fortified foods or supplements.

Supplements 

Vitamin B12 is included in multivitamin pills; in some countries grain-based foods such as bread and pasta are fortified with B12. In the US, non-prescription products can be purchased providing up to 5,000µg each, and it is a common ingredient in energy drinks and energy shots, usually at many times the recommended dietary allowance of B12. The vitamin can also be a prescription product via injection or other means.

Sublingual methylcobalamin, which contains no cyanide, is available in 5mg tablets. The metabolic fate and biological distribution of methylcobalamin are expected to be similar to that of other sources of vitamin B12 in the diet. The amount of cyanide in cyanocobalamin is generally not a concern, even in the 1,000µg dose, since the amount of cyanide there (20µg in a 1,000µg cyanocobalamin tablet) is less than the daily consumption of cyanide from food, and therefore cyanocobalamin is not considered a health risk.

Intramuscular or intravenous injection 
Injection of hydroxycobalamin is often used if digestive absorption is impaired, but this course of action may not be necessary with high-dose oral supplements (such as 0.5–1.0mg or more), because with large quantities of the vitamin taken orally, even the 1% to 5% of free crystalline B12 that is absorbed along the entire intestine by passive diffusion may be sufficient to provide a necessary amount.

A person with cobalamin C disease (which results in combined methylmalonic aciduria and homocystinuria) may require treatment with intravenous or intramuscular hydroxocobalamin or transdermal B12, because oral cyanocobalamin is inadequate in the treatment of cobalamin C disease.

Nanotechnologies used in vitamin B12 supplementation 
Conventional administration does not ensure specific distribution and controlled release of vitamin B12. Moreover, therapeutic protocols involving injection require health care people and commuting of patients to the hospital thus increasing the cost of the treatment and impairing the lifestyle of patients. Targeted delivery of vitamin B12 is a major focus of modern prescriptions. For example, conveying the vitamin to the bone marrow and nerve cells would help myelin recovery. Currently, several nanocarriers strategies are being developed for improving vitamin B12 delivery with the aim to simplify administration, reduce costs, improve pharmacokinetics, and ameliorate the quality of patients' lives.

Pseudovitamin-B12 
Pseudovitamin-B12 refers to B12-like analogues that are biologically inactive in humans. Most cyanobacteria, including Spirulina, and some algae, such as Porphyra tenera (used to make a dried seaweed food called nori in Japan), have been found to contain mostly pseudovitamin-B12 instead of biologically active B12. These pseudo-vitamin compounds can be found in some types of shellfish, in edible insects, and at times as metabolic breakdown products of cyanocobalamin added to dietary supplements and fortified foods.

Pseudovitamin-B12 can show up as biologically active vitamin B12 when a microbiological assay with Lactobacillus delbrueckii subsp. lactis is used, as the bacteria can utilize the pseudovitamin despite it being unavailable to humans. To get a reliable reading of B12 content, more advanced techniques are available. One such technique involves pre-separation by silica gel and then assessment with B12-dependent E. coli bacteria.

A related concept is antivitamin B12, compounds (often synthetic B12 analogues) that not only have no vitamin action, but also actively interfere with the activity of true vitamin B12. The design of these compounds mainly involved replacement of the metal ion. These compounds have the potential to be used for analyzing B12 utilization pathways or even attacking B12-dependent pathogens.

Drug interactions

H2-receptor antagonists and proton-pump inhibitors
Gastric acid is needed to release vitamin B12 from protein for absorption. Reduced secretion of gastric acid and pepsin, from the use of H2 blocker or proton-pump inhibitor (PPI) drugs, can reduce absorption of protein-bound (dietary) vitamin B12, although not of supplemental vitamin B12. H2-receptor antagonist examples include cimetidine, famotidine, nizatidine, and ranitidine. PPIs examples include omeprazole, lansoprazole, rabeprazole, pantoprazole, and esomeprazole. Clinically significant vitamin B12 deficiency and megaloblastic anemia are unlikely, unless these drug therapies are prolonged for two or more years, or if in addition the person's dietary intake is below recommended levels. Symptomatic vitamin deficiency is more likely if the person is rendered achlorhydric (a complete absence of gastric acid secretion), which occurs more frequently with proton pump inhibitors than H2 blockers.

Metformin
Reduced serum levels of vitamin B12 occur in up to 30% of people taking long-term anti-diabetic metformin. Deficiency does not develop if dietary intake of vitamin B12 is adequate or prophylactic B12 supplementation is given. If the deficiency is detected, metformin can be continued while the deficiency is corrected with B12 supplements.

Other drugs
Certain medications can decrease the absorption of orally consumed vitamin B12, including: colchicine, extended-release potassium products, and antibiotics such as gentamicin, neomycin and tobramycin. Anti-seizure medications phenobarbital, pregabalin, primidone and topiramate are associated with lower than normal serum vitamin concentration. However, serum levels were higher in people prescribed valproate. In addition, certain drugs may interfere with laboratory tests for the vitamin, such as amoxicillin, erythromycin, methotrexate and pyrimethamine.

Chemistry

Vitamin B12 is the most chemically complex of all the vitamins. The structure of B12 is based on a corrin ring, which is similar to the porphyrin ring found in heme. The central metal ion is cobalt.  As isolated as an air-stable solid and available commercially, cobalt in vitamin B12 (cyanocobalamin and other vitamers) is present in its +3 oxidation state.  Biochemically, the cobalt center can take part in both two-electron and one-electron reductive processes to access the "reduced" (B12r, +2 oxidation state) and "super-reduced" (B12s, +1 oxidation state) forms.  The ability to shuttle between the +1, +2, and +3 oxidation states is responsible for the versatile chemistry of vitamin B12, allowing it to serve as a donor of deoxyadenosyl radical (radical alkyl source) and as a methyl cation equivalent (electrophilic alkyl source).  Four of the six coordination sites are provided by the corrin ring, and a fifth by a dimethylbenzimidazole group. The sixth coordination site, the reactive center, is variable, being a cyano group (–CN), a hydroxyl group (–OH), a methyl group (–CH3) or a 5′-deoxyadenosyl group.  Historically, the covalent carbon–cobalt bond is one of the first examples of carbon–metal bonds to be discovered in biology. The hydrogenases and, by necessity, enzymes associated with cobalt utilization, involve metal–carbon bonds. Animals have the ability to convert cyanocobalamin and hydroxocobalamin to the bioactive forms adenosylcobalamin and methylcobalamin by means of enzymatically replacing the cyano or hydroxyl groups.

Methods for the analysis of vitamin B12 in food 
Several methods have been used to determine the vitamin B12 content in foods including microbiological assays, chemiluminescence assays, polarographic, spectrophotometric and high-performance liquid chromatography processes. The microbiological assay has been the most commonly used assay technique for foods, utilizing certain vitamin B12-requiring microorganisms, such as Lactobacillus delbrueckii subsp. lactis ATCC7830. However, it is no longer the reference method due to the high measurement uncertainty of vitamin B12. Furthermore, this assay requires overnight incubation and may give false results if any inactive vitamin B12 analogues are present in the foods. Currently, radioisotope dilution assay (RIDA) with labelled vitamin B12 and hog IF (pigs) have been used to determine vitamin B12 content in food. Previous reports have suggested that the RIDA method is able to detect higher concentrations of vitamin B12 in foods compared to the microbiological assay method.

Biochemistry

Coenzyme function
Vitamin B12 functions as a coenzyme, meaning that its presence is required in some enzyme-catalyzed reactions. Listed here are the three classes of enzymes that sometimes require B12 to function (in animals):

 Isomerases
 Rearrangements in which a hydrogen atom is directly transferred between two adjacent atoms with concomitant exchange of the second substituent, X, which may be a carbon atom with substituents, an oxygen atom of an alcohol, or an amine. These use the adoB12 (adenosylcobalamin) form of the vitamin.
 Methyltransferases
 Methyl (–CH3) group transfers between two molecules. These use the MeB12 (methylcobalamin) form of the vitamin.
 Dehalogenases
 Some species of anaerobic bacteria synthesize B12-dependent dehalogenases, which have potential commercial applications for degrading chlorinated pollutants. The microorganisms may either be capable of de novo corrinoid biosynthesis or are dependent on exogenous vitamin B12.

In humans, two major coenzyme B12-dependent enzyme families corresponding to the first two reaction types, are known. These are typified by the following two enzymes:

Methylmalonyl coenzyme A mutase (MUT) is an isomerase enzyme which uses the AdoB12 form and reaction type 1 to convert L-methylmalonyl-CoA to succinyl-CoA, an important step in the catabolic breakdown of some amino acids into succinyl-CoA, which then enters energy production via the citric acid cycle. This functionality is lost in vitamin B12 deficiency, and can be measured clinically as an increased serum methylmalonic acid (MMA) concentration. The MUT function is necessary for proper myelin synthesis. Based on animal research, it is thought that the increased methylmalonyl-CoA hydrolyzes to form methylmalonate (methylmalonic acid), a neurotoxic dicarboxylic acid, causing neurological deterioration.

Methionine synthase, coded by MTR gene, is a methyltransferase enzyme which uses the MeB12 and reaction type 2 to transfer a methyl group from 5-methyltetrahydrofolate to homocysteine, thereby generating tetrahydrofolate (THF) and methionine. This functionality is lost in vitamin B12 deficiency, resulting in an increased homocysteine level and the trapping of folate as 5-methyl-tetrahydrofolate, from which THF (the active form of folate) cannot be recovered. THF plays an important role in DNA synthesis so reduced availability of THF results in ineffective production of cells with rapid turnover, in particular red blood cells, and also intestinal wall cells which are responsible for absorption. THF may be regenerated via MTR or may be obtained from fresh folate in the diet. Thus all of the DNA synthetic effects of B12 deficiency, including the megaloblastic anemia of pernicious anemia, resolve if sufficient dietary folate is present. Thus the best-known "function" of B12 (that which is involved with DNA synthesis, cell-division, and anemia) is actually a facultative function which is mediated by B12-conservation of an active form of folate which is needed for efficient DNA production. Other cobalamin-requiring methyltransferase enzymes are also known in bacteria, such as Me-H4-MPT, coenzyme M methyltransferase.

Physiology

Absorption
Food B12 is absorbed by two processes. The first is a vitamin B12-specific intestinal mechanism using intrinsic factor through which 1–2 micrograms can be absorbed every few hours, by which most food consumption of the vitamin is absorbed. The second is a passive diffusion process. The human physiology of active vitamin B12 absorption from food is complex. Protein-bound vitamin B12 must be released from the proteins by the action of digestive proteases in both the stomach and small intestine. Gastric acid releases the vitamin from food particles; therefore antacid and acid-blocking medications (especially proton-pump inhibitors) may inhibit absorption of B12. After B12 has been freed from proteins in food by pepsin in the stomach, R-protein (also known as haptocorrin and transcobalamin-1), a B12 binding protein that is produced in the salivary glands, binds to B12. This protects the vitamin from degradation in the acidic environment of the stomach. This pattern of B12 transfer to a special binding protein secreted in a previous digestive step, is repeated once more before absorption. The next binding protein for B12 is intrinsic factor (IF), a protein synthesized by gastric parietal cells that is secreted in response to histamine, gastrin and pentagastrin, as well as the presence of food. In the duodenum, proteases digest R-proteins and release their bound B12, which then binds to IF, to form a complex (IF/B12). B12 must be attached to IF for it to be efficiently absorbed, as receptors on the enterocytes in the terminal ileum of the small bowel only recognize the B12-IF complex; in addition, intrinsic factor protects the vitamin from catabolism by intestinal bacteria.

Absorption of food vitamin B12 thus requires an intact and functioning stomach, exocrine pancreas, intrinsic factor, and small bowel. Problems with any one of these organs makes a vitamin B12 deficiency possible. Individuals who lack intrinsic factor have a decreased ability to absorb B12. In pernicious anemia, there is a lack of IF due to autoimmune atrophic gastritis, in which antibodies form against parietal cells. Antibodies may alternately form against and bind to IF, inhibiting it from carrying out its B12 protective function. Due to the complexity of B12 absorption, geriatric patients, many of whom are hypoacidic due to reduced parietal cell function, have an increased risk of B12 deficiency. This results in 80–100% excretion of oral doses in the feces versus 30–60% excretion in feces as seen in individuals with adequate IF.

Once the IF/B12 complex is recognized by specialized ileal receptors, it is transported into the portal circulation. The vitamin is then transferred to transcobalamin II (TC-II/B12), which serves as the plasma transporter. Hereditary defects in production of the transcobalamins and their receptors may produce functional deficiencies in B12 and infantile megaloblastic anemia, and abnormal B12 related biochemistry, even in some cases with normal blood B12 levels. For the vitamin to serve inside cells, the TC-II/B12 complex must bind to a cell receptor, and be endocytosed. The transcobalamin II is degraded within a lysosome, and free B12 is finally released into the cytoplasm, where it may be transformed into the proper coenzyme, by certain cellular enzymes (see above).

Investigations into the intestinal absorption of B12 point out that the upper limit of absorption per single oral dose, under normal conditions, is about 1.5µg. The passive diffusion process of B12 absorption—normally a very small portion of total absorption of the vitamin from food consumption—may exceed the R-protein and IF mediated absorption when oral doses of B12 are very large (a thousand or more µg per dose) as commonly happens in dedicated-pill oral B12 supplementation. This allows pernicious anemia and certain other defects in B12 absorption to be treated with oral megadoses of B12, even without any correction of the underlying absorption defects. See the section on supplements above.

Storage and excretion
How fast B12 levels change depends on the balance between how much B12 is obtained from the diet, how much is secreted and how much is absorbed. The total amount of vitamin B12 stored in the body is about 2–5mg in adults. Around 50% of this is stored in the liver. Approximately 0.1% of this is lost per day by secretions into the gut, as not all these secretions are reabsorbed. Bile is the main form of B12 excretion; most of the B12 secreted in the bile is recycled via enterohepatic circulation. Excess B12 beyond the blood's binding capacity is typically excreted in urine. Owing to the extremely efficient enterohepatic circulation of B12, the liver can store 3 to 5 years' worth of vitamin B12; therefore, nutritional deficiency of this vitamin is rare in adults in the absence of malabsorption disorders. In the absence of enterohepatic reabsorption, only months to a year of vitamin B12 are stored.

Synthesis

Biosynthesis

Vitamin B12 is derived from a tetrapyrrolic structural framework created by the enzymes deaminase and cosynthetase which transform aminolevulinic acid via porphobilinogen and hydroxymethylbilane to uroporphyrinogen III. The latter is the first macrocyclic intermediate common to heme, chlorophyll, siroheme and B12 itself. Later steps, especially the incorporation of the additional methyl groups of its structure, were investigated using 13C methyl-labelled S-adenosyl methionine. It was not until a genetically engineered strain of Pseudomonas denitrificans was used, in which eight of the genes involved in the biosynthesis of the vitamin had been overexpressed, that the complete sequence of methylation and other steps could be determined, thus fully establishing all the intermediates in the pathway.

Species from the following genera and the following individual species are known to synthesize B12: Propionibacterium shermanii, Pseudomonas denitrificans, Streptomyces griseus, Acetobacterium, Aerobacter, Agrobacterium, Alcaligenes, Azotobacter, Bacillus, Clostridium, Corynebacterium, Flavobacterium, Lactobacillus, Micromonospora, Mycobacterium, Nocardia, Proteus,
Rhizobium, Salmonella, Serratia, Streptococcus and Xanthomonas.

Industrial
Industrial production of B12 is achieved through fermentation of selected microorganisms. Streptomyces griseus, a bacterium once thought to be a fungus, was the commercial source of vitamin B12 for many years. The species Pseudomonas denitrificans and Propionibacterium freudenreichii subsp. shermanii are more commonly used today. These are grown under special conditions to enhance yield. Rhone-Poulenc improved yield via genetic engineering P. denitrificans. Propionibacterium, the other commonly used bacteria, produce no exotoxins or endotoxins and are generally recognized as safe (have been granted GRAS status) by the Food and Drug Administration of the United States.

The total world production of vitamin B12 in 2008 was 35,000 kg (77,175 lb).

Laboratory

The complete laboratory synthesis of B12 was achieved by Robert Burns Woodward and Albert Eschenmoser in 1972. The work required the effort of 91 postdoctoral fellows (mostly at Harvard) and 12 PhD students (at ETH Zurich) from 19 nations. The synthesis constitutes a formal total synthesis, since the research groups only prepared the known intermediate cobyric acid, whose chemical conversion to vitamin B12 was previously reported. This synthesis of vitamin B12 is of no practical consequence due to its length, taking 72 chemical steps and giving an overall chemical yield well under 0.01%. Although there have been sporadic synthetic efforts since 1972, the Eschenmoser–Woodward synthesis remains the only completed (formal) total synthesis.

History

Descriptions of deficiency effects
Between 1849 and 1887, Thomas Addison described a case of pernicious anemia, William Osler and William Gardner first described a case of neuropathy, Hayem described large red cells in the peripheral blood in this condition, which he called "giant blood corpuscles" (now called macrocytes), Paul Ehrlich identified megaloblasts in the bone marrow, and Ludwig Lichtheim described a case of myelopathy.

Identification of liver as an anti-anemia food
During the 1920s, George Whipple discovered that ingesting large amounts of raw liver seemed to most rapidly cure the anemia of blood loss in dogs, and hypothesized that eating liver might treat pernicious anemia. Edwin Cohn prepared a liver extract that was 50 to 100 times more potent in treating pernicious anemia than the natural liver products. William Castle demonstrated that gastric juice contained an "intrinsic factor" which when combined with meat ingestion resulted in absorption of the vitamin in this condition. In 1934, George Whipple shared the 1934 Nobel Prize in Physiology or Medicine with William P. Murphy and George Minot for discovery of an effective treatment for pernicious anemia using liver concentrate, later found to contain a large amount of vitamin B12.

Identification of the active compound
While working at the Bureau of Dairy Industry, U.S. Department of Agriculture, Mary Shaw Shorb was assigned work on the bacterial strain Lactobacillus lactis Dorner (LLD), which was used to make yogurt and other cultured dairy products. The culture medium for LLD required liver extract. Shorb knew that the same liver extract was used to treat pernicious anemia (her father-in-law had died from the disease), and concluded that LLD could be developed as an assay method to identify the active compound. While at the University of Maryland she received a small grant from Merck, and in collaboration with Karl Folkers from that company, developed the LLD assay. This identified "LLD factor" as essential for the bacteria's growth. Shorb, Folker and Alexander R. Todd, at the University of Cambridge, used the LLD assay to extract the anti-pernicious anemia factor from liver extracts, purify it, and name it vitamin B12. In 1955, Todd helped elucidate the structure of the vitamin, for which he was awarded the Nobel Prize in Chemistry in 1957. The complete chemical structure of the molecule was determined by Dorothy Hodgkin, based on crystallographic data in 1956, for which for that and other crystallographic analyses she was awarded the Nobel Prize in Chemistry in 1964. Hodgkin went on to decipher the structure of insulin.

Five people have been awarded Nobel Prizes for direct and indirect studies of vitamin B12: George Whipple, George Minot and William Murphy (1934), Alexander R. Todd (1957), and Dorothy Hodgkin (1964).

Commercial production
Industrial production of vitamin B12 is achieved through fermentation of selected microorganisms. As noted above, the completely synthetic laboratory synthesis of B12 was achieved by Robert Burns Woodward and Albert Eschenmoser in 1972, though this process has no commercial potential, requiring almost 70 steps and having a yield well below 0.01%.

Society and culture
In the 1970s, John A. Myers, a physician residing in Baltimore, developed a program of injecting vitamins and minerals intravenously for various medical conditions. The formula included 1000 µg of cyanocobalamin. This came to be known as the Myers' cocktail. After his death in 1984, other physicians and naturopaths took up prescribing "intravenous micro-nutrient therapy" with unsubstantiated health claims for treating fatigue, low energy, stress, anxiety, migraine, depression, immunocompromised, promoting weight loss and more. However, other than a report on case studies there are no benefits confirmed in the scientific literature. Healthcare practitioners at clinics and spas prescribe versions of these intravenous combination products, but also intramuscular injections of just vitamin B12. A Mayo Clinic review concluded that there is no solid evidence that vitamin B12 injections provide an energy boost or aid weight loss.

There is evidence that for elderly people, physicians often repeatedly prescribe and administer cyanocobalamin injections inappropriately, evidenced by the majority of subjects in one large study either having had normal serum concentrations or had not been tested prior to the injections.

See also 
 Adenosylcobalamin
 Cobalamin biosynthesis
 Cyanocobalamin
 Hydroxocobalamin
 Methylcobalamin

 Vitamins

Further reading

References

External links 
 
 
 
 
 

 
B vitamins
Cofactors
Organocobalt compounds